The Mystery of Mr. Bernard Brown is a 1921 British silent mystery film directed by Sinclair Hill and starring Ruby Miller, Annie Esmond and Clifford Heatherley. It was made by Stoll Pictures, and based on an 1896 novel The Mystery of Mr. Bernard Brown by E. Phillips Oppenheim.

Plot summary
When the fiancée of a squire's daughter is killed, suspicion falls on a novelist.

Cast
 Ruby Miller as Helen Thirwell  
 Pardoe Woodman as Bernard Brown  
 Clifford Heatherley as Sir Alan Beaumerville  
 Annie Esmond as Lady Thirwell  
 Ivy King as Rachel Kynaston  
 Lewis Dayton as Sir Geoffrey Kynaston  
 Frank Petley as Benjamin Levy  
 Teddy Arundell as Guy Thirwell  
 Norma Whalley as Mrs. Martival

References

Bibliography
 Low, Rachael. History of the British Film, 1918-1929. George Allen & Unwin, 1971.

External links

1921 films
1921 mystery films
British silent feature films
British mystery films
Films directed by Sinclair Hill
Stoll Pictures films
Films shot at Cricklewood Studios
Films based on British novels
British black-and-white films
1920s English-language films
1920s British films
Silent mystery films